Duninów  is a village in the administrative district of Gmina Chocianów, within Polkowice County, Lower Silesian Voivodeship, in southwestern Poland. Prior to 1945 it was a part of Germany.

References

Villages in Polkowice County